Reidar Amble Ommundsen (17 March 1890 – 26 December 1940) was a Norwegian ski jumper and soccer player.

Career
In 1911 he won the Norwegian soccer cup final 5–2, with his club Lyn Fotball against IF Urædd.

On 7 February 1915 he set the ski jumping world record distance of 54 metres (177 ft) at Vikkollen hill in Mjøndalen, Norway.

Ski jumping world record

References

External links 
 Eiker Arkiv: Kulturminneåret 2009 på Eiker: Vikkollen (2. januar 2009)
 Arne Thoresen: Lengst gjennom lufta. Versal Forlag, Oslo 2007. , s. 54-55
 RSSSF Norway: Cupfinalen 1911
 Norges Fotballforbund: Norgesmestere menn 1902-2009

1890 births
1940 deaths
Norwegian male ski jumpers
People from Flakstad
Sportspeople from Nordland